The Lower Oder Valley International Park is a shared German-Polish nature reserve. It comprises the western banks of the Oder river within the Uckermark district in the German state of Brandenburg as well as the steep eastern banks in the Gryfino and Police counties of the Polish West Pomeranian Voivodeship further north.

The German part of the core area is the Nationalpark Unteres Odertal (Lower Oder Valley National Park).  There is an information centre at Criewen.
The Polish part of the core area is the Park Krajobrazowy Dolina Dolnej Odry (Lower Odra Valley Landscape Park).

By decision of the German-Polish Environmental Council in 1992 the German, Polish and Brandenburg environment ministers as well as the voivode of Szczecin created the Lower Oder Valley International Park.

The flat western shore of the Oder features several levees, which in order to control the water level and to prevent highfloods are regularly opened in winter and spring. The water flows freely into extensive floodplains covered until April when the dikes are closed again and the remaining water is drained.

Fauna
There is a Special Protection Area (SPA) for birds.
These plains are habitats for birds such as the black stork, the aquatic warbler, and the corn crake.
There are animals such as the European otter and the European beaver.

Flora
There are plants like the submediterranean pubescent oak.

References

External links

 National park site
 Tourism Association 

National parks of Germany
Protected areas of Brandenburg
Protected areas established in 1997
Schwedt
Tourist attractions in Brandenburg
1997 establishments in Germany
Central European mixed forests